The Putnam County Charter School System (PCCSS), is a public school district in Putnam County, Georgia, United States, based in Eatonton.

Schools
The Putnam County School District has one primary school, one elementary school, one middle school, and one high school.

Primary school
Putnam County Primary School

Elementary school
Putnam County Elementary School

Middle school
Putnam County Middle School

High school
Putnam County High School

References

External links

School districts in Georgia (U.S. state)
Education in Putnam County, Georgia